James Tower Campbell (born February 3, 1973) is an American political candidate and former professional ice hockey player. He played 285 games in the National Hockey League (NHL) for the Tampa Bay Lightning, Florida Panthers, Chicago Blackhawks, Montreal Canadiens, St. Louis Blues and Mighty Ducks of Anaheim before finishing his career in Europe. Campbell was born in Worcester, Massachusetts, but grew up in Westborough, Massachusetts.

He is a candidate in the Republican primary for Missouri's 4th district in the 2022 United States House of Representatives elections.

Playing career
As a youth, Campbell played in the 1987 Quebec International Pee-Wee Hockey Tournament with the Boston Bruins  minor ice hockey team.

He was drafted by the Montreal Canadiens round 2 #28 overall  1991 NHL Entry Draft, but he really broke out with the St. Louis Blues in 1996, scoring 84 points in two seasons. However, a lingering groin problem caught up with him and he started to really slump, bouncing around from team to team, and league to league. He played for the Springfield Falcons in the American Hockey League while contracted to the Tampa Bay Lightning who loaned him to the Philadelphia Phantoms midway through the 05–06 season in exchange for Dan Cavanaugh. While in Philly he posted 12 goals, 17 assists, for 29 points and 46 Penalty minutes in 35 games.

Campbell played 2 games for HC Neftekhimik Nizhnekamsk in the Russian Super League in 2003–04 and spent 2006-07 with EHC Basel in Switzerland's Nationalliga A.
Campbell, or "Soup" as he is well known as, officially hung up the skates in 2008, but still remains a force in the St. Louis hockey scene.

In 1993 Campbell won Tampere Cup and became top scorer of this tournament.

Personal life

Jim Campbell lives in St. Louis, where he operates a number of pubs including JP Fields' in Clayton and the Geyer Inn in Kirkwood. He has coached for several local youth teams including Whitfield School, Chesterfield CSDHL, and Carshield AAA. His son Seamus plays for the Aberdeen Wings and has committed to play college hockey at Quinnipiac University.

Career statistics

Regular season and playoffs

International

Awards and honors

Transactions
 January 21, 1996 - Traded to Mighty Ducks of Anaheim by Montreal Canadiens for Robert Dirk.
 July 11, 1996 - Signed as a free agent by St. Louis.
 October 4, 1999 - Loaned to Manitoba (IHL) by St. Louis, recalled November 1, 1999.
 August 21, 2000 - Signed as a free agent by Montreal Canadiens.
 November 19, 2001 - Signed as a free agent by Chicago Blackhawks.
 July 19, 2002 - Signed as a free agent by Florida Panthers.
 December 10, 2003 - Signed as a free agent by Chicago (AHL).
 August 11, 2004 - Signed as a free agent by New York Islanders.
 August 18, 2005 - Signed as a free agent by Tampa Bay Lightning.

References

External links

1973 births
American men's ice hockey right wingers
Baltimore Bandits players
EHC Basel players
EHC Visp players
Bridgeport Sound Tigers players
Chicago Blackhawks players
Chicago Wolves players
American expatriate ice hockey players in Russia
Florida Panthers players
Fredericton Canadiens players
HC Neftekhimik Nizhnekamsk players
Hull Olympiques players
Ice hockey people from Worcester, Massachusetts
Ice hockey players at the 1994 Winter Olympics
Living people
Manitoba Moose (IHL) players
Mighty Ducks of Anaheim players
Montreal Canadiens draft picks
Montreal Canadiens players
Norfolk Admirals players
Olympic ice hockey players of the United States
People from Westborough, Massachusetts
Philadelphia Phantoms players
Quebec Citadelles players
St. Louis Blues players
San Antonio Rampage players
Sportspeople from Worcester County, Massachusetts
Springfield Falcons players
Tampa Bay Lightning players
Worcester IceCats players